Lieutenant-Colonel Neil Loudon Desmond McLean, DSO** (28 November 1918 – 17 November 1986), known as Billy McLean, was a Scottish politician and intelligence officer in the British Army. During World War II, he worked for the Special Operations Executive and was involved in clandestine missions in Ethiopia, China, and particularly Albania. In 1954 he served as a Unionist Member of Parliament for Inverness.

Family and education
McLean was born in Sutherland, the elder son of Neil Gillean McLean, who had made a great deal of money trading with India and owned an estate at Glencalvie. The family called him "Billy". He was educated at Eton College, where he excelled in fencing, becoming Captain of the school team. He was then sent to the Royal Military College, Sandhurst to train to become an officer. Having spent his holiday periods fox hunting, he was a keen sportsman and won many point to point races while attending Sandhurst.

WWII and Army service
In August 1938 on leaving Sandhurst, McLean was commissioned into the Royal Scots Greys. The following year he was posted to Palestine and spent the first two years of the Second World War there. In 1941, he was transferred to the Special Operations Executive, an unorthodox military unit which worked behind enemy lines on sabotage and espionage. After completing his training he was sent to join Col. Wingate's Gideon Force in Ethiopia, where he commanded a mixed group of Ethiopian and Eritrean irregulars (nicknamed "McLean's Foot") against the occupying Italian army. For his efforts he was awarded the Distinguished Military Medal of Haile Selassie I in 1941. 1942 saw McLean shifted to a staff job with the Special Operations Executive (SOE); first in Cairo, Egypt then in Syria and back in Palestine. He also worked for MI9 in Istanbul aiding resistance fighters in Nazi-occupied countries.

Albanian missions
In early 1943 McLean was selected by SOE to lead a mission in occupied Albania, for which he was promoted to Major. His team was parachuted behind enemy lines in April 1943, where they made contact with the partisan National Liberation Movement (LANÇ) and the nationalist, anti-Communist, anti-Zog movement, the Balli Kombëtar. McLean then organized them into the 1st Partisan Brigade, and arranged their training and armament. After his evacuation from Albania in November 1943, McLean was awarded the Distinguished Service Order and promoted to Lieutenant-Colonel. However, even after he left tension between the partisans and the nationalists in Albania was still causing concern to SOE at which point the Foreign Office and McLean devised a plan to unite them in a common struggle against the Axis forces there. In April 1944, exactly one year later, McLean returned to Albania with a small team known as "The Musketeers" which included Major David Smiley and Captain Julian Amery. Unfortunately they could not persuade the nationalists to join with the partisans; nor could McLean get SOE-HQ in Bari to support his nominee to lead the partisan fight against the Axis powers, Abaz Kupi. Meanwhile, the partisans grew suspicious of this outside interference, and eventually McLean and his team had to be withdrawn. Ironically, British strategy was subsequently altered to recognize only the LANÇ who went on to convert Albania into a Communist state.

Post-war
Early in 1945 McLean volunteered to work for SOE against the Japanese forces in China and was appointed military advisor to Sir Clarmont Skrine, the British consul in Kashgar. He was still working undercover there when the war ended. After some years traveling in the late 1940s, McLean resigned his commission and returned to Albania one last time, joining a clandestine organization operated by the United States and British intelligence agencies to undermine Enver Hoxha and the Communist government there. In 1949 he married Daška Ivanović, from Dubrovnik in Croatia. Coincidentally his new brother-in-law, diplomat Vane Ivanovic, had been a member of the Yugoslav section of the Political Warfare Executive (PWE), the propaganda arm of SOE, during the war.

Entry to politics
At the 1950 general election, McLean ran as the Conservative Party candidate for Preston South, a newly created constituency which was expected to be marginal. He was defeated by 149 votes. He stood again in the 1951 general election, but was again defeated by the extremely narrow margin of 16 votes. This was the smallest majority in any constituency in that election. In the summer of 1952, McLean was chosen as the Unionist Party candidate for Inverness, where the sitting Member of Parliament Lord Malcolm Douglas-Hamilton intended to stand down. He toured the constituency continuously, familiarizing himself with its problems and speaking to local groups. Lord Malcolm resigned in autumn 1954 and a by-election was called for 21 December. The Liberal Party was strong in the constituency and campaigned against the practice of "plural farming" by which landowners farmed multiple farms with a single labour force, and which was unpopular with agricultural workers. McLean's work in nursing the constituency paid off as he was elected by 1,331 votes.

Owing to illness, McLean did not make his maiden speech until March 1956, and he chose to speak about Egypt and Gamal Abdel Nasser whom he regarded with extreme concern. McLean was a strong supporter of the decision to invade Egypt during the Suez Crisis, and an equally strong opponent of the decision shortly thereafter to withdraw. The Members of Parliament who took this view were known as the "Suez Group"; McLean did not join those who abandoned the Conservative whip in 1957, but did declare that he was in sympathy with them and that "the M.P.s who have resigned have raised the flag for many of us who have not resigned". In general McLean's Parliamentary contributions were concentrated on foreign affairs.

He also visited areas of concern, including French Indochina and Algeria to find the situation on the ground, and reported back to British newspapers. In September 1962 while visiting Algeria he was pinned down for an hour by a firefight between rival groups. That year he also began to work with Muhammad al-Badr in resisting Egyptian efforts to install an ally as President of North Yemen where he became the principal military advisor to the Royalist forces. He persuaded the Foreign Office not to recognize the Communist-backed government in the country; an accomplishment described by McLean's biographer Xan Fielding as his "crowning achievement". In June 1964 McLean introduced a Private Members Bill aimed at protecting some paper mills, shipbuilding and cotton firms which had received government grants from nationalization. During the 1964 general election he found himself under severe pressure from the Liberal Party and ended up losing his seat.

Final years
Being out of Parliament left McLean more time to travel, especially in the Middle East. He kept up his work in Yemen, and had contacts with most of the Muslim Arab states including Jordan where he had developed a close relationship with then monarch King Hussein. Fielding claimed that he was a kind of "unofficial under-secretary" of the Foreign Office, and quoted a 1979 letter from Harold Macmillan which said "You are one of those people whose services to our dear country are known only to a few". In his retirement he was appointed to the Royal Company of Archers, the Queen's bodyguard in Scotland.

McLean suffered from diabetes and septicaemia and died of heart failure in 1986. At his side were his family, including his step-grandson, the actor Cary Elwes. All of his diaries, notes and orders kept meticulously from all his campaigns now reside in the Imperial War Museum.

Literature
 One Man in His Time: The life of Lieutenant-Colonel NLD ('Billy') McLean, DSO by Xan Fielding; Macmillan; 1st Edition (1 November 1990)

See also
David Smiley
Julian Amery
Xan Fielding
Sophie Moss

References 
Notes

Bibliography
 "McLean, Neil Loudon Desmond" in Oxford Dictionary of National Biography
 The London Gazette 
 Who Was Who, A & C Black
 Daily Telegraph Second Book of Obituaries
 Amery, Julian, "Albania at War 1939-45", The Oxford Companion to the Second World War (1995), pp. 24–26.
 Amery, Julian, Sons of the Eagle. A Study in Guerilla War (1948) Macmillan & C° Ltd, London. SOE in Albania by the third Musketeer.
 Dorril, Stephen, MI6 : Inside the Covert World of Her Majesty's Secret Intelligence Service, (2000) The Free Press, New York, 
 Elwes, Cary, As You Wish: Inconceivable Tales from the Making of The Princess Bride (2014) Touchstone; First edition (14 October 2014) 
 Fischer, Bernd J., Albania at War, 1939-1945 (1999) West Lafayette, Purdue University Press
 Smiley, David "Albanian Assignment" (1984) Chatto & Windus, London. SOE in Albania by the second Muskeeter, with foreword by Patrick Leigh Fermor
 Smiley, David, with Peter Kemp, "Arabian Assignment" (1975) Cooper, London. Oman and Yemen.
 Smiley, David "Irregular Regular" (1994) Michael Russell, Norwich . Translated into French by Thierry Le Breton, Au cœur  de l'action clandestine. Des Commandos au MI6, L'Esprit du Livre Editions, France, 2008. The Memoirs of a SOE officer and MI6 agent.

External links 
 

1918 births
1986 deaths
Scottish anti-communists
British Army personnel of World War II
British military personnel of the 1936–1939 Arab revolt in Palestine
Royal Scots Greys officers
Unionist Party (Scotland) MPs
Members of the Parliament of the United Kingdom for Highland constituencies
People educated at Eton College
Graduates of the Royal Military College, Sandhurst
British Special Operations Executive personnel
UK MPs 1951–1955
UK MPs 1955–1959
UK MPs 1959–1964
Members of the Royal Company of Archers
People from Sutherland